Marchment is a surname. Notable people with the surname include:

 Bryan Marchment (1969–2022), Canadian ice hockey player
 Ella Marchment (born 1992), British opera director and university professor
 Josephine Marchment (1897–1966), Irish spy
 Kennedy Marchment (born 1996), Canadian ice hockey forward
 Mason Marchment (born 1995), Canadian professional ice hockey forward

See also
 Marchmont (disambiguation)

References

Surnames of English origin